Shinobu Ueshima (born 26 December 1971) is a Japanese snowboarder. She competed in the women's giant slalom event at the 1998 Winter Olympics.

References

1971 births
Living people
Japanese female snowboarders
Olympic snowboarders of Japan
Snowboarders at the 1998 Winter Olympics
Sportspeople from Hokkaido